Fothergill may refer to:

Fothergill, Cumbria, a place in England
Fothergill (surname), people with the surname Fothergill

See also
Fothergill gold medal, awarded triennially by the Medical Society of London.
Fothergill medal, previously awarded by the Royal Humane Society.
Fothergill-Round Medal, a Victoria Football League award that is presented to the most promising young talent.
Fothergill's sign, a medical sign
Fothergill island, an island in Lake Kariba
 Milner-Fothergill gold medal, awarded by the University of Edinburgh for contribution to therapeutics.
 Fothergilla, a plant genus